Sami Lahssaini (born 18 September 1998) is a Belgian professional footballer who plays as a midfielder for Seraing, on loan from FC Metz.

Club career
On 21 July 2022, Lahssaini returned to Seraing for another loan.

Career statistics

References

1998 births
Living people
Belgian sportspeople of Moroccan descent
Belgian footballers
Belgian expatriate footballers
Association football midfielders
Standard Liège players
R.F.C. Seraing (1922) players
FC Metz players
Belgian Third Division players
Championnat National 3 players
Challenger Pro League players
Belgian Pro League players
Belgian expatriate sportspeople in France
Expatriate footballers in France